The Lewes Speed Trials were speed trials held on a defunct course in Lewes, Sussex, England, sometimes known as "The Motor Road."

History
The first meeting took place on 27 July 1924, on "a private road near Lewes", location unidentified. The event was organised by the Brighton & Hove Motor Cycle and Light Car Club, on a quarter-mile course. Fastest time of the day was set by J.A. Hall, Frazer Nash-GN, in a time of 16.6 secs.
"Speed trials were held on the Race Hill at Lewes three or four times a year from 1925 to 1939, at the instance of the Brighton & Hove MC, the Kent & Sussex LCC, the Bugatti Owners' Club and the Vintage Sports Car Club,..."

In 1933 The Autocar reported: "The course bends slightly to the left, is one-third of a mile long, narrow, none too smooth, and slightly uphill. It leads directly off the London-Newhaven road just before reaching Lewes."

Jean Bugatti attended the races on 21 October 1933. Denis Jenkinson, motor racing journalist, attended his first motor sport event here in 1936. The Autocar reported from the meeting on 12 June 1937: "The first appearance in competition of the new four-wheel independent-suspension Atalanta was at Lewes. G.A.T. Weldon drove this 1½-litre model." Bill Boddy, editor of Motor Sport, drove the original HRG sports car, 1,497 c.c., at Lewes on 4 September 1937 with a best time of 27.4 sec, finishing third in the novices class. On 15 July 1939, Sydney Allard took a class win in a time of 22.12 secs.

The Lewes Record
Comparisons of times recorded at different meetings and by different clubs are problematic. There were differences in the method of timing (the electric Bachelier method favoured by the Bugatti O.C. allowed the competitor to start in his own time) and even differences in the length of the course.

Lewes Speed Trials past winners

Key: R = Course Record; S/C = Supercharged.

See also
 Brighton Speed Trials
 Firle Hill Climb
 Prescott Speed Hill Climb

References

Bibliography
 John Bolster, Specials, G.T. Foulis & Co Ltd, Reprinted 1971.
 Jeremy Wood, Speed on the Downs: Lewes Speed Trials 1924-39, JWFA Books, 

Hillclimbs
Motorsport venues in England
Sport in East Sussex
Hamsey